Hontheim is an Ortsgemeinde – a municipality belonging to a Verbandsgemeinde, a kind of collective municipality – in the Bernkastel-Wittlich district in Rhineland-Palatinate, Germany.

Geography

Location 
The municipality lies on a plateau in the southern Volcanic Eifel at the northern edge of the Kondelwald forest. The municipal area is 58.4% wooded. Hontheim belongs to the Verbandsgemeinde of Traben-Trarbach.

Constituent communities 
Hontheim's Ortsteile, besides the main centre, are Wispelt, Krinkhof and Bonsbeuern.

History 
Beginning in 1794, Hontheim lay under French rule. In 1814 it was assigned to the Kingdom of Prussia at the Congress of Vienna. Since 1947, it has been part of the then newly founded state of Rhineland-Palatinate.

Politics

Municipal council 
The council is made up of 12 council members, who were elected by proportional representation at the municipal election held on 7 June 2009, and the honorary mayor as chairwoman.

The municipal election held on 7 June 2009 yielded the following results:

Coat of arms 
The municipality's arms might be described thus: Per fess Or a cross gules and gules a hound courant of the first.

Economy and infrastructure 
Through the municipality runs Bundesstraße 421. To the west runs the Autobahn A 1. In Ürzig is a railway station on the Koblenz-Trier railway line. The state spa town of Bad Bertrich, with Germany's only Glauber's salt (sodium sulphate decahydrate; Na2SO4•10H2O) hot spring, is only 3 km away.

References

External links 
 Hontheim 

Bernkastel-Wittlich